John Francis Pollard (born 23 November 1944) is a British historian, an emeritus fellow of Trinity Hall, Cambridge, fellow of the Royal Historical Society, and Emeritus Professor of Modern European History at Anglia Ruskin University. His research interests include fascist and neo-fascist movements, the ideology of present-day neo-Nazism, political and social Catholicism and history of the nineteenth and twentieth century Italy and the Papacy.

Biography
Pollard was born at South Shields, County Durham, United Kingdom on 23 November 1944.
After graduating from South Shields Grammar-Technical School for Boys, John Pollard took his B.A. Degree in History at Cambridge University in 1966, and M.A. in 1970.
John Pollard completed his PhD at the University of Reading with Doctoral thesis on fascism - 'From the Conciliazione to the Riconciliazione: The Church and the Fascist Regime in Italy, 1929 to 1932'.
In 1990 John Pollard received the title of Professor of Modern European History.
He took early retirement from Anglia Polytechnic University in 2003, but continues to teach undergraduate and graduate students as a Supervisor in the Faculty of History of the University of Cambridge. In 2019, he was awarded the degree of Doctor of Letters (Litt.D.) by the University of Cambridge.

Notable publications
 2014 The Papacy in the Age of Totalitarianism, 1914-1958, Oxford University Press
 
 2007 Catholicism in Modern Italy: Religion, Politics and Society, 1861-2005, Routledge
 2005 Money and the Rise of the Modern Papacy: Financing the Vatican, 1850-1950, Cambridge University Press
 1999 The Unknown Pope: Benedict XV (1914-1922) and the Pursuit of Peace, Geoffrey Chapman 
 1998 The Fascist Experience in Italy, Routledge 
 1985 The Vatican and Italian Fascism, 1929-1932: A Study in Conflict, Cambridge University Press

References

External links
 University of Cambridge profile

Historians of the Catholic Church
Fellows of the Royal Historical Society
Fellows of Trinity Hall, Cambridge
Living people
1944 births